Sts. Volodymyr and Olha Church is a Ukrainian Greek Catholic parish church in Chicago. It is adorned with golden domes and a mosaic above the entrance depicting the Christianization of Ukraine. The church is one of the landmarks of Chicago's Ukrainian Village, a historic district in northwest central Chicago.

History

Sts. Volodymyr and Olha Ukrainian Catholic Parish in Chicago was founded in 1969 by Patriarch Josyf Slipyj and the bishop of the Eparchy of Chicago, Yaroslav Gabro. Among the reasons for establishing this distinct parish was the desire to preserve and faithfully adhere to the traditions of the Ukrainian Church. The elements contributing to the Ukrainian Greek Catholic Church's distinctiveness within the Catholic Church are the Julian Calendar, the Byzantine Rite in the Ukrainian recension, as well as a rich ethnic spiritual heritage.

Structure and interior
Construction of the new church was completed between 1971 and 1973. Architect Yaroslav Korsunsky of Minneapolis designed the church, employing the Byzantine-Ukrainian style of 11-13th century Ukraine. Churches of this style are traditionally cruciform, with the altar facing to the East. The rounded gold dome, along with a strong preference for circular patterns—avoiding almost all angular design elements—is also typical of this style.

The iconostasis's central doors ("royal gates") depict the four Gospel authors; over the gates are the Last Supper. Also on the iconostas are St. Nicholas, St. John the Baptist, as well as St. Volodymyr and Saint Olha.

The wooden frame of the iconostas was hand-carved from oak by Paul Mozes of New York. The icons are the work of Ivan Dykyj. The stained glass windows are the work of Yaroslaw Baransky of Yonkers, New York. The windows in the southern apse portray the Protection of the Mother of God, flanked by Saint Volodymyr and Saint Olha. The windows in the northern apse portray some of the patron saints of Ukraine: Saint Andrew the Apostle, who first came to Ukraine to proclaim the word of God, Saint George (Yuriy) the Conqueror, and Saint Michael the Archangel.

Placement also conveys a message. Icons are not placed haphazardly throughout the church, rather, their placement follows a definite scheme. In the dome, which represents heaven, we see Christ the Pantocrator (the Creator of all). Descending, we see the events of salvation history, until finally near ground level, we find ourselves in the company of our forbearers- the saints. This suggests that the church is the union of heaven and earth as well as the past and the present. The crucifixion is portrayed in the northern apse, while in the southern apse we see the events leading to the resurrection. This placement emphasizes that there are two aspects to a single reality.

Ukrainian Cultural Center
The Ukrainian Cultural Center at Sts. Volodymyr and Olha Parish was founded to serve the Ukrainian Greek Catholic parish community as well as future generations of Ukrainian-Americans, primarily through Ukrainian language outreach. The construction of this complex was completed in 1988. In commemoration of the Millennium of Christianity in Ukraine, a memorial statue of Sts. Prince Volodymyr and Princess Olha was constructed next to the Cultural Center in 1989.

Various parish-related organizations as well as art associations, scientific organizations, and professional and national groups use the Cultural Center. Most notable among these are the "Hromovytsia", "Ukrainian School of Dance", the "Ukrainian Catholic University", representatives of the "Ukrainian Congressional Committee of America", and scientific organizations such as "The Ukrainian Encyclopedia", the "Ukrainian Medical Association" and others. Various receptions and events are regularly held in the Cultural Center for the Ukrainian community.

See also
Ukrainian Village, Chicago
Ukrainian Catholic Eparchy of Chicago

References

External links
  http://www.stsvo.org/ | Church website (Ukrainian only -- donate button is marked in English)
 

Chicago Volodymyr and Olha Church
Chicago Volodymyr and Olha Church
Volodymyr and Olha Church
Volodymyr and Olha Church
Chicago Volodymyr and Olha Church
Chicago Volodymyr and Olha Church
Chicago Volodymyr and Olha Church